David Duguid may refer to:

 David Duguid (medium) (1832–1907), Scottish spiritualist medium and cabinet-maker
 David Duguid (politician) (born 1970), Scottish politician